Brethertons LLP is a firm of solicitors in Rugby, founded by Count William Ferdinand Wratislaw in 1810. Brethertons was established at Church Street in Rugby but in 2014 consolidated all of its Rugby locations into, one new purpose built office called Montague House, located at 2 Clifton Road. Additionally, it has three other offices located in Banbury, Bicester and London.

History
The first location of Brethertons was in an historic house on Church Street which was built by Wratislaw's father Marc Mari Emanuel Wratislaw. It was the first house in Rugby to be roofed in slate.

In 1992, the name of the firm changed following the retirement of John Duffy, a senior partner of the firm, from Bretherton Turpin and Pell, to the current name of Brethertons LLP.

In 2014 Brethertons combined three offices in Rugby into one location.

The Wratislaws
Count William Ferdinand was the son of Marc Mari Emanuel Wratislaw a Bohemian nobleman who migrated to the UK in 1770. Marc did not register his title until just before his death, after which William Ferdinand took it upon himself to regain his title. During his career as a solicitor, Wratislaw championed many causes, most notably of which was his case against Thomas Arnold of Rugby School, which was highly influential in the rise of English Preparatory Schools which catered for boys between the ages of 7 and 11, this case lead to the creation of the first Preparatory school in the Isle of Wight in the same year, 1837.

The Wratislaw name is continually intertwined with the development of Rugby into the town that it is today. This was particularly true of Count Wratislaw, who formed the Rugby Gas Company which provided street lighting for Rugby, a major development for the town.

The high profile of the cases which they championed earned the Wratislaws the respect and favour of the local population. Wait described one instance after his petition to parliament for more Almshouses where William Ferdinand Wratislaw gained an almost royal welcome. Wait states that:

"such was the local enthusiasm that when [Count Wratislaw] returned from London, some of the townsmen went to meet him at Dunchurch, took the horses out of his carriage and drew him triumphantly into the Town".

This report demonstrates Count Wratislaws position as a prominent figure in public life.

Rugby was one of the first towns to be appointed a local health board (Croydon being the other), for which Wratislaw was on the board and received an overwhelming majority of votes. This health board went on to create an underground sewage system which transformed not only the health of Rugby's inhabitants, but also the reputation and standing of the town.

The prominence of the Wratislaw name within Rugby public life did not end with William Ferdinand, as his good deeds were taken up and furthered by his son Theodore Wratislaw. Theodore founded with the then Headmaster of Rugby, Dr. Frederick Temple, the Rugby Freehold Society which dramatically transformed Rugby, and the percentage of owner occupation was well above that of the national average.

References

Bibliography

Law firms of the United Kingdom
Companies based in Rugby, Warwickshire